The following is the structure of the Italian Navy as of June 2020. It is considered a multiregional and a blue-water navy.

Chief of the Navy General Staff 

The Chief of the Navy General Staff heads the Navy General Staff in Rome, manages the bureaucratic aspects of the navy, and supervises four major commands.

 Chief of the Navy General Staff (Capo di stato maggiore della Marina)
 Corps of the Port Captaincies (Corpo delle Capitanerie di Porto), Coast Guard - in peacetime assigned to the Ministry of Infrastructure and Transport
 Navy Military Personnel Employment Directorate (Direzione per l'Impiego del Personale Militare della Marina - MARIPERS)
 Administrative Responsibility Centre Main Office (Ufficio Generale del Centro di Responsabilità Amministrativa - MARIUGCRA)
 Navy Health Inspectorate (Ispettorato di Sanità della Marina Militare - MARISPESAN)
 Forensic Medicine Military Department Bari (Dipartimento Militare di Medicina Legale Bari Palese - DMML Bari Palese)
 Forensic Medicine Military Department La Spezia (Dipartimento Militare di Medicina Legale La Spezia - DMML La Spezia)
 Navy Officer Clubs Agency (Ente Circoli della Marina Militare - MARICIRCOLI)
 Officers, and petty officers clubs in Ancona, Augusta, Brindisi, Cagliari, La Maddalena, La Spezia, Livorno, Messina, Naples, Rome, Taranto, and Venice, and an officers holiday club on Monte Terminillo
 Navy Carabinieri Command (Comando Carabinieri per la Marina)
 Navy Officers Promotion Commissions Office (Ufficio Commissioni di Avanzamento per gli Ufficiali della Marina Militare - MARICAU)
 Navy NCOs, Sergeants, Volunteers in Permanent Service Promotion Commissions Office (Ufficio Generale Commissioni Avanzamento Marescialli, Sergenti e Volontari in S.P. della Marina Militare - MARICAST)
 Navy Engineer Corps Chief Office (Ufficio Capo di Corpo del Genio della Marina)
 Naval Engineer Specialty (Specialità Genio Navale)
 Naval Weapons Specialty (Specialità Armi Navali)
 Infrastructure Specialty (Specialità Infrastrutture)
 Maritime Military Medical Corps Chief Office (Ufficio Capo di Corpo Sanitario Militare Marittimo)
 Maritime Military Commissariat Corps Chief Office (Ufficio Capo di Corpo di Commissariato Militare Marittimo)
 Port Captaincies Corps Chief Office (Ufficio Capo di Corpo delle Capitanerie di Porto)
 Andrea Doria Institut (Istituto Andrea Doria - MARIDORIA), the navy's orphanage

Navy General Staff 
The functions of the Navy General Staff are divided in two sections: one under direct control of the Chief of the Navy General Staff, and one under control of the Deputy Chief of the Navy General Staff. The Chief of the Navy General Staff's section is further divided into offices and commands that are part of the Navy General Staff and offices and commands that report to the Chief of the Navy General Staff, but are outside the actual Navy General Staff.

 Chief of the Navy General Staff (Capo di stato maggiore della Marina)
 Navy General Staff (Stato Maggiore della Marina - MARISTAT)
 Adjutant of the Chief of the Navy General Staff (Assistante del Capo di Stato Maggiore della Marina)
 Special Secretariat of the Chief of the Navy General Staff (Segreteria Particolare Capo di Stato Maggiore della Marina)
 Main Financial Planning Office (Ufficio Pianificazione Generale Finanziaria - UGPF)
 Legal Affairs Main Office (Ufficio Generale Affari Legale - UGAL)
 Special Forces and Underwater Units Office (Ufficio Forze Speciali e Reparti Subacquei - UFS)
 Public Information and Communication Office (Ufficio Pubblica Informazione e Comunicazione - UPICOM)
 Accident Prevention and Vigilance, and Environmental Protection Main Coordination Office (Ufficio Generale di Coordinamento per la Prevenzione, la Vigilanza Antinfortunistica e la Tutela dell'Ambiente - UGECOPREVA)
 Central Security Body of the Navy (Organo Centrale di Sicurezza della Marina Militare - MARINA OCS)

Deputy Chief of the Navy General Staff 
The Deputy Chief of the Navy General Staff manages the bureaucratic aspects of the Navy.

 Deputy Chief of the Navy General Staff (Sottocapo di Stato Maggiore della Marina)
 Adjutant of the Deputy Chief of the Navy General Staff (Assistante del Sottocapo di Stato Maggiore della Marina)
 Special Secretariat of the Deputy Chief of the Navy General Staff (Segreteria Particolare Sottocapo di Stato Maggiore della Marina)
 Main Secretariat of the Navy General Staff (Segreteria Generale di Stato Maggiore Marine della Marina)
 1st Department Personnel (1° Reparto Personale)
 3rd Department Maritime Planning and Policy (3° Reparto Pianificazione e Politica Marittima)
 4th Department Infrastructure and Logistics (4° Reparto Infrastrutture e Logistica)
 5th Department Submarines (5° Reparto Sommergibili)
 6th Department Aircraft (6° Reparto Aeromobili)
 7th Department Ships (7° Reparto Navi)
 8th Department Amphibious Forces (8° Reparto Anfibio)
 C4 and Security Department (Reparto C4 e Sicurezza)
 General Affairs Office (Ufficio Affari Generale - UAG)
 Space and Technological Innovation Office (Ufficio Spazio e Innovazione Tecnologica)
 Headquarters Command Office (Ufficio Comando alla Sede)
 History Office (Ufficio Storico)
 Naval History Museum (Museo Storico Navale), in Venice
 Naval Technical Museum (Museo Tecnico Navale), in La Spezia
 Prevention and Protection Service (Servizio di Prevenzione e Protezione)
 Spiritual Adjutant (Assistante Spirituale)

Fleet Command 

The Fleet Command is responsible for all operational units of the Italian Navy, with the exception of the Special Forces. Based in the Santa Rosa military district of Rome the command is headed by the Commander in Chief Naval Fleet ( or CINCNAV) with the rank of Vice admiral, who reports directly to the Chief of the Navy.

 Naval Headquarters Santa Rosa (Quartier Generale Marina Santa Rosa - QUARTGENMARINA Santa Rosa), at the Santa Rosa military district
 Virtual Regional Maritime Traffic Centre (V‐RMTC)
 Maritime Surveillance Operations Centre (Centrale Operativa di Sorveglianza Marittima - COSM)
 Aero-naval Operations Centre (Centrale Operativa Aero‐navale - COAN)
 Sail training ship "Amerigo Vespucci"
 Sail training ship "Palinuro"
 Anti-submarine Analysis and Evaluation Section (Sezione Valutazione e Analisi Anti Sommergibile - SVAAS), at Naval Air Station Sigonella

1st Naval Division 

 Horizon-class air-defence destroyer: "Caio Duilio"
 Bergamini-class general-purpose frigates: "Carlo Bergamini", "Luigi Rizzo"
 Bergamini-class anti-submarine frigates: "Virginio Fasan", "Carlo Margottini"
 Maestrale-class anti-submarine frigates: "Grecale", "Libeccio"
 Vulcano-class logistic support ship: "Vulcano"
 Electronic surveillance ship: "Elettra"
 Naval Station La Spezia (Stazione Navale La Spezia - MARISTANAV La Spezia), manages the harbour operations
 Ciclope-class deep-sea tugboats: "Titano", "Gigante"
 Porto-class coastal tugboats: "Porto Conte", "Porto Empedocle", "Porto Salvo", "Porto Torres"
 Coastal water tanker: "Bormida"

2nd Naval Division 

The 2nd Naval Division ( - COMDINAV DUE) is based in Taranto and headed by either a Divisional admiral  or a 1 star admiral. The division includes the Italian navy's carrier strike group.

 Aircraft carrier: "Cavour"
 Horizon-class air-defence destroyer: "Andrea Doria"
 Durand de la Penne-class air-defence destroyers: "Luigi Durand de la Penne", "Francesco Mimbelli"
 Bergamini-class general-purpose frigates: "Federico Martinengo", "Antonio Marceglia"
 Bergamini-class anti-submarine frigates: "Carabiniere", "Alpino"
 Maestrale-class anti-submarine frigate: "Zeffiro", "Espero" (Espero in active reserve)
 Stromboli-class replenishment oiler: "Stromboli" (will be replaced by a Vulcano-class logistic support ship)
 Etna-class replenishment oiler: "Etna"
 Naval Station Taranto (Stazione Navale La Spezia - MARISTANAV Taranto), manages the harbour operations
 Ciclope-class deep-sea tugboats: "Saturno", "Tenace", "Ciclope"
 Porto-class coastal tugboats: "Porto Fossone", "Porto Pisano", "Portoferraio", "Portovenere"
 Coastal tugboat: "Ercole"
 Ferry-boat: "Cheradi"

3rd Naval Division 

The division contains all amphibious units of the Italian Navy and together with the San Marco Marine Brigade and the Italian Army's Cavalry Brigade "Pozzuolo del Friuli" forms the Italian military's National Sea Projection Capability (Forza di proiezione dal mare).

 Aircraft carrier: "Giuseppe Garibaldi" (will be replaced in June 2022 by landing helicopter dock "Trieste")
 San Giorgio-class amphibious transport docks: "San Giorgio", "San Marco", "San Giusto"
 Naval Station Brindisi (Stazione Navale Brindisi - MARISTANAV Brindisi), manages the harbour operations
 Porto-class coastal tugboat: "Porto Corsini"'

 Submarines Command 

The commanding officer of the Submarines Command also heads the Navy General Staff's 5th Department Submarines, and thus is responsible for all submarine assets of the navy, and their procurement, maintenance, development, training, and operational doctrine.

 Submarines Flotilla ( - COMFLOTSOM), in Taranto
 Sauro-class attack submarines: "Salvatore Pelosi", "Giuliano Prini", "Primo Longobardo", "Gianfranco Gazzana-Priaroggia" (to be replaced by four Type 212 NFS submarines)
 Todaro-class attack submarines: "Salvatore Todaro", "Scirè", "Pietro Venuti", "Romeo Romei" Mine Countermeasures Forces Command 

 Mine Warfare Training and Evaluation Centre (Centro Addestramento Guerra di Mine - MARICENDRAG), in La Spezia
 54th Coastal Minesweepers Squadron (Comando 54^ Squadriglia Dragamine Costieri - COMSQUADRAG CINQUE QUATTRO), in La Spezia
 Lerici-class minehunters: "Milazzo", "Vieste" Gaeta-class minehunters: "Gaeta", "Termoli", "Alghero", "Numana", "Crotone", "Viareggio", "Chioggia", "Rimini" (Lerici and Gaeta classes to be replaced with twelve New Generation Minehunters)
 Hydrographic and Research Units Squadron (Comando Squadriglia Unità Idrografiche ed Esperienze - COMSQUAIDRO)
 Hydrographic survey vessel: "Ammiraglio Magnaghi" (will be replaced by the Major Hydro-oceanographic Ship - NIOM)
 Ninfe-class hydrographic survey vessels: "Aretusa", "Galatea" Research vessels: "Leonardo", "Raffaele Rossetti", "Vincenzo Martellotta", "Alliance"

 Coastal Defense and Surveillance Patrol Forces Command 

The Coastal Defense and Surveillance Patrol Forces Command is based in Augusta and headed by a Counter admiral. After the 2014 reform it has transferred most of its coastal defense duties to the Italian Coast Guard and focuses today on offshore patrols.

 Coastal Defense and Surveillance Patrol Forces Command (Comando Forze da Pattugliamento per la Sorveglianza e la Difesa Costiera - COMFORPAT), in Augusta
 1st Patrol Boats Squadron (Comando Prima Squadriglia Pattugliatori - COMSQUAPAT UNO)
 Cassiopea-class offshore patrol vessels: "Cassiopea", "Libra", "Spica", "Vega" (to be replaced by Thaon di Revel-class Light+ offshore patrol vessels)
 Sirio-class offshore patrol vessels: "Sirio", "Orione" 2nd Patrol Boats Squadron (Comando Second Squadriglia Pattugliatori - COMSQUAPAT DUE)
 Comandanti-class offshore patrol vessels: "Comandante Cigala Fulgosi", "Comandante Borsini", "Comandante Bettica", "Comandante Foscari" Naval Station Augusta (Comando Stazione Navale Augusta - MARISTANAV Augusta), manages the harbour operations
 Ciclope-class deep-sea tugboats: "Polifemo" Naval Air Forces Command 

The Air Forces Command is headed by a Counter admiral and trains and maintains all the aerial assets of the navy. The commanding officer of the Naval Aviation Command also heads the Navy General Staff's 6th Department Aircraft, and thus is responsible for all air assets of the navy, and their procurement, maintenance, development, training, and operational doctrine.

 Air Forces Command (Comando delle Forze Aeree - COMFORAER), at the Santa Rosa military district
 Aerial Section (Sezione Aerea - SEZAER), at Pratica di Mare Air Base with 3x P.180 Maritime liaison planes

 Naval Aircraft Station 
 Naval Aircraft Station (Stazione Aeromobili della Marina Militare - MARISTAER), at Taranto-Grottaglie Airport
 Carrier Air Group (Gruppo Aerei Imbarcati - GRUPAER)
 Operations Unit (Reparto Operazioni) with AV-8B+ Harrier II fighters (being replaced by F-35B Lightning II)
 Operational Support Unit (Reparto Supporto Operativo)
 Operational Informations Unit (Reparto Informazioni Operative)
 4th Helicopter Group (Quarto Gruppo Elicotteri - GRUPELICOT QUATTRO)
 Operations Unit (Reparto Operazioni) with SH-90A ASuW/ASW helicopters and Camcopter S-100 unmanned aerial vehicles
 Training Unit (Reparto Addestramento) with SH-90A ASuW/ASW helicopters
 Operational Support Unit (Reparto Supporto Operativo)
 Operational Informations Unit (Reparto Informazioni Operative)

 Naval Helicopter Station Luni 
 Naval Helicopter Station Luni (Stazione Elicotteri della Marina Militare Luni - MARISTAELI Luni), at Sarzana-Luni Airport
 Air-marittime Experimental Centre (Centro sperimentale aeromarittimo)
 1st Helicopter Group (Primo Gruppo Elicotteri - GRUPELICOT UNO)
 Helicopter Assault Unit (Reparto Eliassalto) with MH-101A transport helicopters supporting COMSUBIN
 ASuW/ASW/EW Unit (Reparto AWW/ASW/EW) with EH-101A HEW helicopters
 Operational Support Unit (Reparto Supporto Operativo)
 Operational Informations Unit (Reparto Informazioni Operative)
 5th Helicopter Group (Quinto Gruppo Elicotteri - GRUPELICOT CINQUE)
 Helicopter Assault Unit (Reparto Eliassalto) with MH-90A tactical transport helicopters supporting COMSUBIN
 ASuW/ASW Unit (Reparto AWW/ASW) with SH-90A ASuW/ASW helicopters
 Operational Support Unit (Reparto Supporto Operativo)
 Operational Informations Unit (Reparto Informazioni Operative)

 Naval Helicopter Station Catania 
 Naval Helicopter Station Catania (Stazione Elicotteri della Marina Militare Catania - MARISTAELI Catania), at Catania–Fontanarossa Airport
 2nd Helicopter Group (Secondo Gruppo Elicotteri - GRUPELICOT DUE)
 Operations Unit (Reparto Operazioni) with SH-90A ASuW/ASW helicopters
 Operational Support Unit (Reparto Supporto Operativo)
 Operational Informations Unit (Reparto Informazioni Operative)
 3rd Helicopter Group (Terzo Gruppo Elicotteri - GRUPELICOT TRE)
 Operations Unit (Reparto Operazioni) with SH-101A ASuW/ASW helicopters
 Training Unit (Reparto Addestramento) with SH-101A ASuW/ASW helicopters
 Operational Support Unit (Reparto Supporto Operativo)
 Operational Informations Unit (Reparto Informazioni Operative)

 Amphibious Forces Command 
The Amphibious Forces Command (Comando della Forza Anfibia - COMFORANF) is based at the Santa Rosa military district in Rome and headed by Counter admiral and controls the Italian military's National Sea Projection Capability (Forza di proiezione dal mare) and the San Marco Marine Brigade. The National Sea Projection Capability consists of the San Marco Marine Brigade, the navy's 3rd Naval Division and the  Italian Army's Cavalry Brigade "Pozzuolo del Friuli". The commanding officer of the Amphibious Forces Command also heads the Navy General Staff's 8th Department Amphibious Forces, and thus is responsible for all amphibious forces of the navy, and their procurement, maintenance, development, training, and operational doctrine.

 San Marco Marine Brigade 
 San Marco Marine Brigade (Brigata Marina San Marco - COMFORSBARC), in Brindisi
 Brigade Headquarters (Quartier Generale della Brigata Marina San Marco - QUARTGEN Brigata Marina San Marco), in Brindisi
 Amphibious Integration Centre (Centro Integrazione Anfibia), in Brindisi
 Command Support Battalion (Battaglione Supporto al Comando), in Brindisi
 C4 Company
 Technical Support Company
 Training Battalion "Caorle" (Battaglione Scuole "Caorle"), in Brindisi
 Formation Company
 Training, Instruction, Specialization Company
 Pedagne Team, manages the Pedagne Islands training area
 Landing Craft Group (Gruppo mezzi da sbarco della Marina Militare), in Brindisi - mans the landing craft of the amphibious ships and manages the ship-to-beach traffic
 Propulsion and Vessels Section
 Maritime Section
 Beach Organization Section
 Landing Craft Team, with 9x LCM62-class Landing Craft Mechanized, 4x LCM23-class Landing Craft Mechanized
 Boat Team, with 20x MTP96-class Landing Craft Vehicle Personnel

 1st San Marco Regiment 
The 1st San Marco Regiment is based in Brindisi and is the amphibious landing force of the Navy.

 1st San Marco Regiment (1° Reggimento San Marco), in Brindisi
 Command Unit (Reparto Comando)
 Command Company with an Air Support Element team
 Signal Company
 Paratroopers Swimmers Company
 2x Reconnaissance platoons, 2x SALT platoons (Supporting Arms Liaison Team)
 EOD/IEDD Engineer Platoon
 FHT Platoon (Field HUMINT Team)
 1st Assault Battalion "Grado" (1° Battaglione Assalto "Grado")
 1st Assault Company "Bafile"
 3x Assault platoons, 1x support weapons platoon
 2nd Assault Company "Tobruk"
 3x Assault platoons, 1x support weapons platoon
 Support Weapons Company
 1x Command support platoon, 1x AAV7-A1 platoon with amphibious assault vehicles (will be replaced with Amphibious Combat Vehicles)
 2nd Assault Battalion "Venezia" (2° Battaglione Assalto "Venezia")
 3rd Assault Company "An Nassiriya"
 3x Assault platoons, 1x support weapons platoon
 4th Assault Company "Monfalcone"
 3x Assault platoons, 1x support weapons platoon
 Support Weapons Company
 1x Command support platoon, 1x AAV7-A1 platoon with amphibious assault vehicles (will be replaced with Amphibious Combat Vehicles)
 3rd Combat Logistic Support Battalion "Golametto" (3° Battaglione Supporto Logistico al Combattimento "Golametto")
 Command Support Platoon
 Logistic Company
 Tactical Transport Company
 Medical Company

 2nd San Marco Regiment 
The 2nd San Marco Regiment is based in Brindisi. The regiment undertakes maritime interdiction operations and provides embarked naval protection teams for military and civilian ships.

 2nd San Marco Regiment (2° Reggimento San Marco), in Brindisi
 Mobility Team
 Naval Operations Battalion (Battaglione Operazioni Navali), in Brindisi
 2x Naval operations companies, each with 10x ship teams
 Interdiction and Protection Battalion (Battaglione Interdizione e Protezione), in Brindisi
 Force Protection Company, with 10x teams
 Port Protection Company, with 10x teams

 3rd San Marco Regiment 
The 3rd San Marco Regiment based in Taranto is the navy's installation defense service (Servizio difesa installazioni - SDI), which guards and protects the bases of the navy.

 3rd San Marco Regiment (3° Reggimento San Marco), in Taranto
 K9 Unit, in Taranto
 SDI Battalion North (Battaglione SDI Nord), in La Spezia
 Command Support Team
 Telecommunications Team
 SDI Company Liguria, in La Spezia
 3x SDI platoons: in La Spezia (Military Harbour), Luni (Navy Helicopter Station), and Ancona (Ammunition Depot Poggio)
 SDI Company Sardinia, in La Maddalena
 3x SDI platoons: at La Maddalena (Non-commissioned Officers School), Santo Stefano (Ammunition Depot), and Tavolara (NATO Very Low Frequency Station)
 SDI Battalion Centre - Rome (Battaglione SDI Centro - Roma), in Rome
 Command Support Team
 Telecommunications Team
 SDI Company Rome, at the Navy General Staff
 Honor Guard Company, in Rome
 SDI Battalion South (Battaglione SDI Sud), in Taranto
 Command Support Team
 Telecommunications Team
 SDI Company Taranto, in Taranto
 3x SDI platoons: in Taranto (Military Harbour), Grottaglie (Navy Helicopter Station), and Pozzuoli (Ammunition Depot Montagna Spaccata)
 SDI Company Brindisi, in Brindisi
 3x SDI platoons: in Brindisi (Military Harbour), Mesagne (Ammunition Depot), and at the San Marco Marine Brigade headquarter
 SDI Company Sicily, in Augusta
 4x SDI platoons: in Augusta (Military Harbour), Priolo Gargallo (Ammunition Depot Cava di Sorciaro), Catania (Navy Helicopter Station), and the NATO Pier in Augusta
 National Emergencies Company (Strade Sicure Operation), in Taranto

 C4 and Security Command 
The C4 and Security Command is headed by a Counter admiral and operates the navy signal, communications and radar network.

 C4 and Security Command (Comando C4 e Sicurezza della Marina Militare - COMC4S MM), at the Santa Rosa military district
 Navy Programming Centre (Centro di Programmazione della Marina Militare - MARICENPROG), in Taranto
 Navy Cryptographic Centre (Centro Crittografico della Marina Militare - MARICRYPTO), at the Santa Rosa military district
 Telecommunications and IT Centre Rome (Centro di Telecomunicazioni ed Informatica Roma - MARITELE Roma), at the Santa Rosa military district
 Peripheral Telecommunications and IT Centre Ancona (Centro Periferico Telecomunicazioni ed Informatica Ancona - MARITELE Ancona), in Ancona
 Signal stations in Vieste and Vasto
 Peripheral Telecommunications and IT Centre Augusta (Centro Periferico Telecomunicazioni ed Informatica Augusta - MARITELE Augusta), in Augusta
 Radar stations at Capo Spartivento, Portopalo, Capo Ponente (Lampedusa), and Punta Sottile (Favignana)
 Signal stations in Santa Panagia, Pantelleria and Palombara
 Peripheral Telecommunications and IT Centre La Spezia (Centro Periferico Telecomunicazioni ed Informatica La Spezia - MARITELE La Spezia), in La Spezia
 Radar station at Capo Carbonara
 Signal stations at the forts of Castellana and Rocchetta
 Peripheral Telecommunications and IT Centre Taranto (Centro Periferico Telecomunicazioni ed Informatica Taranto - MARITELE Taranto), in Taranto
 Radar stations at Capo Santa Maria di Leuca, Sant'Andrea di Missipezza, and Capo Rizzuto
 Secondary Telecommunications and IT Centre Brindisi (Centro Secondario Telecomunicazioni ed Informatica Brindisi - MARITELE Brindisi), in Brindisi
 Secondary Telecommunications and IT Centre Cagliari (Centro Secondario Telecomunicazioni ed Informatica Cagliari - MARITELE Cagliari), in Cagliari
 Secondary Telecommunications and IT Centre Naples (Centro Secondario Telecomunicazioni ed Informatica Napoli - MARITELE Napoli), in Naples
 NATO Very Low Frequency Station, on Tavolara island

 Air Naval Training Centre 
The Air Naval Training Centre is headed by a Counter admiral and based in Taranto. It trains the navy's crews for service with the operational units.

 Air Naval Training Centre (Centro di Addestramento Aeronavale - MARICENTADD), in Taranto
 Operations Unit (Reparto Operazioni)
 Aircraft Training Unit (Reparto Addestramento Aeromobili)
 Tactical Training Unit (Reparto Addestramento Tattico)
 Weapon Systems Training Unit (Reparto Addestramento Sistemi di Piattaforma)
 Operations and Weapons Technical Unit (Reparto Tecnico Armi e Operazioni)
 Administrative Logistics Unit (Reparto Logistico Amministrativo)
 Defense and General Support Unit (Reparto Supporto Generale e Difesa)

 Auxiliary Units Flotilla Command 
The Auxiliary Units Flotilla Command  contains all the minor and coastal support vessels of the navy.

 Auxiliary Units Flotilla Command (Comando Flottiglia Unità Ausiliarie - COMFLOTAUS), in La Spezia
 1st Auxiliary Ships Group (Comando Primo Gruppo Navi Ausiliarie - COMGRUPAUS UNO), in La Spezia
 Gorgona-class coastal transport ships: "Gorgona", "Caprera", "Capri" Ponza-class coastal transport ships: "Ponza", "Levanzo", "Tavolara", "Palmaria" Esploratore-class coastal patrol boat: "Staffetta" Presidential yacht "Argo"
 2nd Auxiliary Ships Group (Comando Secondo Gruppo Navi Ausiliarie - COMGRUPAUS DUE), in Messina
 Panarea-class coastal oil tankers: "Panarea", "Linosa", "Favignana", "Salina" Gorgona-class coastal transport ships: "Tremiti", "Pantelleria", "Lipari" Ponza-class coastal transport ship: "Procida" Simeto-class water tankers: "Ticino", "Tirso" Minor Sailing Ships Group (Comando Gruppo Navi a Vela Minori - COMGRUPVELA), in La Spezia with five sail training vessels:
 in La Spezia: "Orsa Maggiore", "Corsaro II"
 in Livorno: "Capricia",  "Stella Polare"
 in La Maddalena: "Caroly"

 10th Coastal Naval Group 
The 10th Naval Coastal Group is the naval component of the United Nations' mission: Multinational Force and Observers, which guards the Egypt-Israeli border in the Sinai peninsula. The 10th Coastal Naval Group is based in Sharm El Sheikh in Egypt and patrols the Straits of Tiran and Gulf of Aqaba. The group consists of three Esploratore-class coastal patrol boats, with the fourth boat of the class Staffetta having returned to Italy in 2014 and being homeported as of 2020 at La Maddalena.

 10th Coastal Naval Group (Comando Decimo Gruppo Navale Costiero - COMGRUPNAVCOST DIECI), in Sharm El Sheikh (Egypt)
 Esploratore-class coastal patrol boats: "Esploratore", "Sentinella", "Vedetta" Raiders and Divers Grouping "Teseo Tesei" 

The Raiders and Divers Grouping "Teseo Tesei" ( - COMSUBIN) in Porto Venere in Liguria is the navy's special forces unit. Headed by a Counter admiral, who reports directly to the Chief of the Navy, the command is operationally assigned to the Italian military's Joint Special Forces Operations Command.

 Grouping Headquarter
 Research Office
 Telecommunications Office
 Technical Office
 Defense and Support Office
 Press Office
 Operational Raiders Group ( - GOI)
 Operational Divers Group ( - GOS)
 Special Naval Group ( - COMGRUPNAVIN)
 Cabrini-class high-speed patrol boats for the Raiders Group: "Angelo Cabrini" and "Tullio Tedeschi" Marino-class diving support vessels for the Divers Group: "Mario Marino" and "Alcide Pedretti" Submarine rescue ship "Anteo" with an SRV-300 deep-submergence rescue vehicle
 Schools Group
 Divers School
 Raiders School
 Underwater and Hyperbaric Medicine School

 Logistic Command 
The Logistic Command is headed by a vice admiral, who reports directly to the Chief of the Navy. Based on Nisida island near Naples the command is responsible for the logistic support of the navy's units, bases and ships, as well as for the maintenance and operation of 157 lighthouses and 667 other navigational aid lights (including seamarks and buoys).

 Logistic Command (Comando Logistico della Marina Militare - MARICOMLOG), on Nisida
 Naval Headquarters Naples (Quartier Generale della Marina Militare Napoli - QUARTGENMARINA Napoli), on Nisida
 New Naval Constructions Preparation Centre (Centro Allestimento Nuove Costruzioni Navali - MARINALLES), in La Spezia
 Joint Military Applications Studies Centre (Centro Interforze Studi per le Applicazioni Militari - CISAM), in San Piero a Grado
 Joint Advanced Ammunitions Centre (Centro Interforze Munizionamento Avanzato - CIMA), in Aulla
 Hydrodynamic Experience Centre (Centro Esperienze Idrodinamiche), in Rome
 Naval Experimentation and Support Centre (Centro di Supporto e Sperimentazione Navale - CSSN), in La Spezia
 Logistic Support Engineering Department (Reparto Ingegneria del Supporto Logistico)
 Experimentation Department (Reparto Sperimentazione)
 Technical-scientific Department (Reparto Tecnico Scientifico)
 Telecommunications and Electronics Institute "Giancarlo Vallauri" (Istituto per le Telecomunicazioni e l'Elettronica "Giancarlo Vallauri"), in Livorno
 Lighthouses Technical Office (Ufficio Tecnico dei Fari - MARITECNOFARI), in La Spezia
 Naval Military Engineering Section Naples (Sezione Genio Militare per la Marina Napoli - MARISEZGENIO Napoli)

 Maritime Command Rome 
 Maritime Command Rome (Comando Marittimo Capitale - MARICAPITALE), in Rome
 Naval Military Engineering Directorate Rome (Direzione Genio Militare per la Marina Roma - MARIGENIMIL Roma)
 Finance Directorate Rome (Direzione di Intendenza Marina Militare Roma - MARINTENDENZA Roma)
 Garrison Infirmary Rome (Infermeria Presidiaria di Roma - MARINFERM Roma)
 Italian Navy Band (Banda Musicale della Marina Militare - MARIBANDA), in Rome

 Maritime Command North 

 Maritime Command North (Comando Marittimo Nord - MARINANORD), in La Spezia
 Arsenal of La Spezia (Arsenale Militare Marittimo La Spezia - MARINARSEN La Spezia)
 Logistic Support Command Cagliari (Comando Supporto Logistico della Marina Militare Cagliari - MARISUPLOG Cagliari)
 Naval Military Engineering Directorate La Spezia (Direzione Genio Militare per la Marina La Spezia - MARIGENIMIL La Spezia)
 Naval Military Engineering Directorate Cagliari (Direzione Genio Militare per la Marina Cagliari - MARIGENIMIL Cagliari)
 Commissariat Directorate La Spezia (Direzione di Commissariato della Marina Militare La Spezia - MARICOMMI La Spezia)
 Administration Directorate Taranto (Sezione della Direzione di Amministrazione della Marina Militare - MARISEZIODIRAM)
 Marine Signals and Lighthouses Command Upper Tyrrhenian Sea (Comando Zona dei Fari e dei Segnalamenti Marittimi Alto Tirreno - MARIFARI La Spezia), in La Spezia operates 36 lighthouses and navigational aids in 36 locations of the upper Tyrrhenian Sea and Tuscan Archipelago
 Marine Signals and Lighthouses Command Sardinia (Comando Zona dei Fari e dei Segnalamenti Marittimi della Sardegna - MARIFARI La Maddalena), in La Maddalena operates lighthouses and navigational aids in 26 locations of Sardinia
 Marine Signals and Lighthouses Command Venice (Comando Zona dei Fari e dei Segnalamenti Marittimi di Venezia - MARIFARI Venezia) operates lighthouses and navigational aids in 24 locations of the upper Adriatic Sea
 Ammunition Depot del Poggio (Deposito Munizioni Montagna Poggio - DEPOMUNI Poggio), in Ancona
 Ammunition Depot Santo Stefano (Deposito Munizioni Montagna Santo Stefano - DEPOMUNI Santo Stefano), on Santo Stefano island
 Garrison Infirmary La Spezia (Infermeria Presidiaria di La Spezia - MARINFERM La Spezia)

 Maritime Command South 

 Maritime Command South (Comando Marittimo Sud - MARINASUD), in Taranto
 Arsenal of Taranto (Arsenale Militare Marittimo Taranto - MARINARSEN Taranto)
 Military Hospital Centre Taranto (Centro Ospedaliero Militare Taranto - MARISPEDAL Taranto)
 Naval Military Engineering Directorate Taranto (Direzione Genio Militare per la Marina Taranto - MARIGENIMIL Taranto)
 Commissariat Directorate Taranto (Direzione di Commissariato della Marina Militare Taranto - MARICOMMI Taranto)
 Administration Directorate Taranto (Direzione di Amministrazione della Marina Militare Taranto - MARIDIRAM Taranto)
 Finance Directorate Brindisi (Direzione di Intendenza Marina Militare Brindisi - MARINTENDENZA Brindisi)
 Ammunition Directorate Taranto (Direzione di Munizionamento della Marina Militare Taranto - DIREMUNI Taranto)
 Marine Signals and Lighthouses Command Naples (Comando Zona dei Fari e dei Segnalamenti Marittimi di Napoli - MARIFARI Napoli) operates lighthouses and navigational aids in 28 locations of the lower Tyrrhenian Sea
 Marine Signals and Lighthouses Command Taranto (Comando Zona dei Fari e dei Segnalamenti Marittimi di Taranto - MARIFARI Taranto) operates lighthouses and navigational aids in 25 locations of the lower Adriatic Sea and Western Ionian Sea
 Ammunition Depot Montagna Spaccata (Deposito Munizioni Montagna Spaccata - DEPOMUNI Montagna Spaccata), in Pozzuoli
 Ammunition Depot Mesagne (Deposito Munizioni Montagna Mesagne - DEPOMUNI Mesagne)
 Garrison Infirmary Augusta (Infermeria Presidiaria di Taranto - MARINFERM Taranto)
 Navy Rowing Sports Center Sabaudia (Centro Sportivo Remiero della Marina Militare Sabaudia - MARIREMO Sabaudia)

 Maritime Command Sicily 

 Maritime Command Sicily (Comando Marittimo Sicilia - MARISICILIA), in Augusta
 Arsenal of Augusta (Arsenale Militare Marittimo Augusta - MARINARSEN Augusta)
 Naval Military Engineering Directorate Augusta (Direzione Genio Militare per la Marina Augusta - MARIGENIMIL Augusta)
 Commissariat Directorate Augusta (Direzione di Commissariato della Marina Militare Augusta - MARICOMMI Augusta)
 Finance Directorate Augusta (Direzione di Intendenza Marina Militare Augusta - MARINTENDENZA Augusta)
 Ammunition Directorate Cava di Sorciaro (Direzione di Munizionamento della Marina Militare Cava di Sorciaro - DIREMUNI Cava di Sorciaro), in Priolo Gargallo
 Marine Signals and Lighthouses Command Sicily (Comando Zona dei Fari e dei Segnalamenti Marittimi della Sicilia - MARIFARI Messina), in Messina operates lighthouses and navigational aids in 50 locations of the lower Tyrrhenian Sea, Western Ionian Sea, and the Strait of Sicily
 Garrison Infirmary Augusta (Infermeria Presidiaria di Augusta - MARINFERM Augusta)

 Schools Command 
The Schools Command is headed by a vice admiral, who reports directly to the Chief of the Navy. Based in Ancona the command is responsible for the selection, formation, training, and education of the navy's personnel.

 Schools Command (Comando Scuole della Marina Militare - MARICOMSCUOLE), in Ancona
 Naval Headquarters Ancona (Quartier Generale della Marina Militare Ancona - QUARTGENMARINA Ancona)
 Maritime Military Studies Institute (Istituto di Studi Militari Marittimi - MARISTUDI), in Venice
 Naval Academy (Accademia Navale - MARINACCAD), in Livorno
 Petty Officers School La Maddalena (Scuola Sottufficiali della Marina Militare La Maddalena - MARISCUOLA La Maddalena)
 Petty Officers School Taranto (Scuola Sottufficiali della Marina Militare Taranto - MARISCUOLA Taranto)
 Naval Military School "Francesco Morosini" (Scuola Navale Militare "Francesco Morosini" - MARISCUOLANAV), in Venice
 Armed Forces Telecommunications School (Scuola Telecomunicazioni delle Forze Armate), in Chiavari
 Selection Centre (Centro di Selezione della Marina Militare - MARICENSELEZ), in Ancona
 Commissariat Directorate Ancona (Direzione di Commissariato della Marina Militare Ancona - MARICOMMI Ancona)
 Naval Military Engineering Schools Section (Sezione del Genio Militare per la Marina Militare Scuole - MARISEZGENIOSCUOLE)

 Hydrographic Institute 
The Hydrographic Institute (Istituto Idrografico della Marina Militare Genova - MARIDROGRAFICO Genova) in Genoa is Italy's national hydrographic, and bathymetric authority. Headed by a counter admiral the institute publishes all official nautical and navigational documentation in Italy and therefore performs regular surveys of the Italian coasts and seas. The institute operates three hydrographic survey vessels: the "Ammiraglio Magnaghi", which will be replaced by a new Major Hydro-oceanographic Ship - NIOM, and the two Ninfe-class hydrographic survey vessels "Aretusa" and "Galatea".

 Aviation Inspector for the Navy 

The Aviation Inspector for the Navy reports to the Chief of the Air Force General Staff and to the Chief of the Navy General Staff. ISPAVIAMAR oversees the technical and logistic aeronautical aspects, and the training of the Italian military's airborne anti-submarine forces. The inspector is a brigadier general of the air force, whose office and staff reside in the navy's headquarter in Rome. The only unit assigned to ISPAVIAMAR is the 41st Anti-submarine Wing "Athos Ammannato", which is under operational control of the Italian Navy.

 Chief of the Air Force General Staff / Chief of the Navy General Staff
 Aviation Inspector for the Navy (Ispettore dell’Aviazione per la Marina - ISPAVIAMAR)
 41st Anti-submarine Wing "Athos Ammannato" (41° Stormo AntiSom "Athos Ammannato"''), at Sigonella Air Base
 86th Crew Training Centre Squadron (86° Gruppo Centro Addestramento Equipaggi)
 88th Anti-submarine Squadron (88° Gruppo AntiSom) with 4× P-72A ASW aircraft
 441st Technical-Operational Services Squadron (441° Gruppo Servizi Tecnico-Operativi)
 541st Logistic-Operational Services Squadron (541° Gruppo Servizi Logistico-Operativi)
 941st Maintenance Squadron (941° Gruppo Efficienza Aeromobili)
 Force Protection Squadron (Gruppo Protezione delle Forze)

Geographic distribution

References

External links
 Website of the Italian Navy

Italian Navy
Italian Navy